Hellish Crossfire is the debut album by German speed metal band Iron Angel, released in 1985.

Track listing

The 2004 and 2014 CD re-issues contains the 1984 Power Metal Attack demo

Personnel
Band members
Dirk Schröder - vocals 
Peter Wittke - guitars 
Sven Strüven - guitars 
Thorsten Lohmann - bass 
Mike Matthes - drums

Production
Uwe Karczewski - cover art
Edda Karczewski - artwork
Horst "Hoddle" Müller - production
Joachim Peters-Schnee - photography

References

1985 debut albums
Iron Angel albums
SPV/Steamhammer albums